The Hellissandur longwave radio mast is a 412-metre-high guyed radio mast used for longwave radio transmissions, and situated at  , near Hellissandur on the Snæfellsnes peninsula of Iceland.

The mast, which is among the tallest structures in Western Europe, is insulated against the ground, and guyed at five levels by steel ropes, which are subdivided by insulators. It was built in 1963 to replace the 190.5-metre-high LORAN-C mast, constructed in 1959 for the North Atlantic LORAN-C chain (GRD 7970).

After the closure of the LORAN-C scheme in 1994, the mast was converted for use by RÚV (The Icelandic National Broadcasting Service) for its longwave transmissions on 189 kHz at a power of 300 kilowatts.

A second, smaller, 30-metre tower was installed by the US Coast Guard in the autumn of 1961 as part of a LORAN-A network paired with Greenland.

See also
 List of masts
 List of tallest structures in Iceland

External links
 
 Drawings of Gufuskálar Longwave Transmission Mast
 Replaces Eiffel Tower 

Infrastructure completed in 1963
LORAN-C transmitters
Radio masts and towers in Europe
Towers in Iceland
1963 establishments in Iceland